Surinam may refer to:

 Surinam (Dutch colony) (1667–1954), Dutch plantation colony in Guiana, South America
 Surinam (English colony) (1650–1667), English short-lived colony in South America
 Surinam, alternative spelling for Suriname, country in South America established 1954